Marker is a municipality in Viken county, Norway. The administrative centre of the municipality is the village of Ørje. Marker was created as a new municipality on 1 January 1964 following the merger of the two former municipalities of Rødenes and Øymark.

The municipality borders Sweden, Aurskog-Høland municipality in Akershus county, and Aremark, Eidsberg, Rakkestad, and Rømskog municipalities in Østfold county. European route E18 passes through the municipality.

The municipality's biggest attractions are the fortresses at Basmo and Ørje. Basmo Fortress lies on an isolated mountain outcrop between lakes Rødenessjøen and Hemnessjøen in the northwestern part of the municipality.

General information

Name 
The Norse form of the name was Markir, which is the plural form of mǫrk f 'woodland, borderland' (see > March).

Coat-of-arms 
Marker's coat-of-arms dates from modern times, having been granted on 16 April 1982. The arms show two white-colored trunk-hooks on a blue background. They are a type of hook, normally on a long pole, used to drive tree trunks through the rivers. The main economic activity in the municipality is forestry, hence the use of the hooks. The two hooks also represent the two villages (and former municipalities) of Rødenes and Øymark.

Rødenes church
Rødenes church (Rødenes kirke) is a medieval-era church in the Rødenes parish of Marker. It belongs to Østre Borgesyssel deanery in the Church of Norway's Borg Diocese. The building, which is of Romanesque architectural style and dates from 1230, has a rectangular nave and a lower and narrower choir. The oaken pulpit dates from the 1600s and the altarpiece from the 1720s. The edifice is of stone and brick. The floorplan is long and has room for 240 seats. The church underwent extensive reconstruction in the years 1703–1709 and again in 1949–1952.

Minorities

Notable people 
 Thorvald Aadahl (1882 in Rødenes – 1962) a newspaper editor, novelist and playwright 
 Ola Isene (1898 in Rødenes – 1973) a Norwegian baritone opera singer and actor 
 Karsten Buer (1913 in Øymark – 1993) a Norwegian harness racing coach
 Ingvar Bakken (1920 in Øymark – 1982) a politician, Mayor of Øymark 1947–1963, Mayor of Marker 1963–1967

Gallery

References

External links 

 
 
 Municipal fact sheet from Statistics Norway
 Culture in Marker on the map 

 
Municipalities of Østfold
Municipalities of Viken (county)